The Springfield International Tennis Classic was a men's tennis tournament played in Springfield, Massachusetts from 1977-1978.  The event was part of the Grand Prix tennis circuit and was held on indoor carpet courts.

Past finals

Singles

Doubles

External links
 ATP results archive

Defunct tennis tournaments in the United States
Grand Prix tennis circuit
Tennis tournaments in Massachusetts
Carpet court tennis tournaments